The Prelude in E-Flat Minor, Op. 23 No. 9 is a 1903 composition by Sergei Rachmaninoff. It is part of Rachmaninoff's Ten Preludes, Op. 23, and is one of the most difficult of the set.

Structure 

A double note theme is announced in measures 1–4. The piece then modulates rapidly from bar to bar, passing through: G flat (measure 5); C flat (measure 6); A flat minor (measure 7); and B flat (measure 9). The primary melody returns at measure 11.

Measures 5 and 6

Measure 7

Measure 9

In measures 5–10 a number of thirds, sixths, seconds, and fourths make up the right hand melody. The left hand is an arpeggiated figure sporadically interrupted with minor seconds.

A reiteration of A  occurs at measure 23.

Measures 22 and 23

The theme occurs again, and then at measure 34, a completely new theme appears in the soprano.

Measures 34 and 35

A series of descending chromatic sequences begins, and the work draws to a close in measure 50.

Measures 50 and 51

Recordings

References

External links 
Vladimir Ashkenazy plays Rachmaninoff Prelude Op.23 No.9 in E flat minor at YouTube

Preludes by Sergei Rachmaninoff
Compositions in E-flat minor